This page lists all described species of the spider family Drymusidae accepted by the World Spider Catalog :

Drymusa

Drymusa Simon, 1892
 D. armasi Alayón, 1981 — Cuba
 D. canhemabae Brescovit, Bonaldo & Rheims, 2004 — Brazil
 D. colligata Bonaldo, Rheims & Brescovit, 2006 — Brazil
 D. dinora Valerio, 1971 — Costa Rica
 D. nubila Simon, 1892 (type) — St. Vincent
 D. philomatica Bonaldo, Rheims & Brescovit, 2006 — Brazil
 D. rengan Labarque & Ramírez, 2007 — Chile
 D. serrana Goloboff & Ramírez, 1992 — Argentina
 D. simoni Bryant, 1948 — Hispaniola
 D. spectata Alayón, 1981 — Cuba
 D. spelunca Bonaldo, Rheims & Brescovit, 2006 — Brazil
 D. tobyi Bonaldo, Rheims & Brescovit, 2006 — Brazil

Izithunzi

Izithunzi Labarque, Pérez-González & Griswold, 2018
 I. capense (Simon, 1893) (type) — South Africa
 I. lina Labarque, Pérez-González & Griswold, 2018 — South Africa
 I. productum (Purcell, 1904) — South Africa
 I. silvicola (Purcell, 1904) — South Africa
 I. zondii Labarque, Pérez-González & Griswold, 2018 — South Africa

References

Drymusidae